Aeolopetra phoenicobapta is a moth in the family Crambidae. It was described by George Hampson in 1898. It is found in New Guinea, where it has been recorded from Fergusson Island.

References

Moths described in 1898
Musotiminae
Moths of New Guinea